Members of the Assembly of French Polynesia were elected on 21 April and 5 May 2013. According to second-round results, the 57 representatives consisted of 38 representatives of Tahoera'a Huiraatira, 11 for the Union for Democracy, and 8 for A Tia Porinetia.

Members

Changes
 In September 2014 Édouard Fritch was elected president, and was replaced by Alice Tinorua. Nicole Sanquer, Tearii Alpha, Nuihau Laurey, Jean-Christophe Bouissou, Frédéric Riveta, and René Temeharo were subsequently appointed to his Cabinet, and were replaced by Juliette Nuupure, Putai Taae, Fernand Tahiata, Evans Haumani, Michel Leboucher, and Maina Sage.
 In October 2017 Nicole Sanquer left Cabinet and returned to the Assembly after being elected to the French National Assembly, displacing Putai Taae.

References

 2013
French Polynesia